Whinfield is a place in County Durham, England. It is situated to the east of Darlington. The population of this Darlington ward taken at the 2011 census was 3,782.

References

Villages in County Durham